Radek Deyl (born 14 September 1989) is a Slovak professional ice hockey defenceman currently playing for HC Košice of the Slovak Extraliga.

Career
Deyl is a product of HC Košice youth system. He was a member of the HK Orange 20 project to preparation for the 2009 World Junior Ice Hockey Championships. He overall played 24 games and earned 8 points for HK Orange in the 2008–09 season. In the next season he was a part of the HC Košice roster, playing 45 games in the regular season and 16 games in the playoffs. He is the Slovak Extraliga champion with Košice from 2008–09, 2009–10, 2010–11 and 2013–14.

On June 9, 2014, Deyl signed with HC Karlovy Vary of the Czech Extraliga. On October 11, 2015, Deyl returned to Košice.

On August 28, 2017, he joined HC Nové Zámky, however his spell only lasted until October 2017 when he joined HC Gherdëina after a two-game spell with HK Dukla Michalovce.

On January 30, 2018, Deyl re-signed for Dukla Michalovce for the 1. Liga playoffs, but due to issues he remained in Italy until after Michalovce's first playoff game against HK Prešov. On June 20, 2018, Deyl signed for French side Étoile Noire de Strasbourg of the Ligue Magnus.

International play
Deyl participated at the 2009 World Junior Ice Hockey Championships, recording 1 assist in 7 games. Slovakia finished 4th at the tournament.

Career statistics

Regular season and playoffs

International

Awards and honours

References

External links

1989 births
Living people
Les Aigles de Nice players
HK Dukla Michalovce players
Étoile Noire de Strasbourg players
HC Košice players
HC Karlovy Vary players
HC Gardena players
HC Nové Zámky players
Slovak ice hockey defencemen
Sportspeople from Košice
Slovak expatriate ice hockey players in the Czech Republic
Expatriate ice hockey players in France
Expatriate ice hockey players in Italy
Slovak expatriate sportspeople in France
Slovak expatriate sportspeople in Italy